State Route 57 (SR 57) is a  state highway that travels northwest-to-southeast through portions of Bibb, Jones, Twiggs, Wilkinson, Washington, Johnson, Emanuel, Candler, Tattnall, Long, and McIntosh counties in the central and southeastern parts of the U.S. state of Georgia. The route connects the eastern part of the Macon area to the Eulonia area, via Swainsboro.

The portion from US 80/SR 19 in East Macon to former SR 243 southwest of Gordon is part of the Fall Line Freeway, a highway that connects Columbus and Augusta. It may also be incorporated into the proposed eastern extension of Interstate 14 (I-14), which is currently entirely within Central Texas and may eventually be extended into Augusta.

Route description

Northern terminus to Swainsboro 
SR 57 begins at an intersection with US 80/SR 19 (Jeffersonville Road), in East Macon in Bibb County. At this intersection, it also starts a concurrency with SR 540. SR 57 and SR 540 travel east, through rural areas of the county, before cutting across the southern corner of Jones County and entering Twiggs County. In Twiggs County, the highways travel through rural areas of the county before entering Wilkinson County. Southwest of Gordon, they intersect the western terminus of former SR 243. Here, SR 540 departs the concurrency. South-southwest of the city is an intersection with SR 18 (Gordon Road). To the east-southeast, in Irwinton, is an intersection with US 441/SR 29. It heads east, into Toomsboro, where it intersects SR 112 (Main Street). The road continues to the southeast, in a curving fashion, and crosses over the Oconee River into the southwestern corner of Washington County. Before entering Johnson County, it intersects SR 68 (Balls Ferry Road). It travels through rural areas of Johnson County until it enters Wrightsville. There, it intersects SR 15 (North Marcus Street). The two highways travel concurrently to the south. Almost immediately, they intersect US 319/SR 31/SR 78 (Elm Street). At this intersection, SR 31 travels concurrently with US 319 south of the city, while SR 78 travels concurrently north of the city. SR 15/SR 57/SR 78 head south for one block, where SR 57 departs to the east, on East College Street. It curves to the east-southeast and travels through rural areas of the county. Then, it enters the town of Kite, where it intersects US 221/SR 171 (Montgomery Street). After that, it enters Emanuel County. The highway heads southeast and meets US 1/SR 4, just before entering Swainsboro. Immediately afterward, it passes the Emanuel County Airport, Watson Lake, and the northeasternmost corner of Swainsboro Golf & Country Club. Approximately  later, the highway intersects US 80/SR 26 (West Main Street) and SR 56 (Tyson Street). The four highways head concurrently to the northwest. At the intersection with US 1 Business/SR 4 Business (North Main Street), US 80/SR 26/SR 56 continue to the northeast, while US 1 Business/SR 4 Business/SR 57 head southeast and leave the city limits.

Southeast of Swainsboro 

At the intersection with US 1/SR 4 (South Main Street), US 1 Business/SR 4 Business end, and US 1/SR 4/SR 57 head southeast. About  later is the northern terminus of SR 297. A short distance later, SR 57 departs to continue its southeasterly routing. In the town of Stillmore, it intersects SR 192 (4th Avenue). Less than  later, the route crosses into Candler County. Shortly after the county line, it has an interchange with Interstate 16 (I-16; James L. Gillis Memorial Highway). Just after the interchange, the route passes through the unincorporated community of Aline, before entering Tattnall County. In Cobbtown, it begins a concurrency with SR 23/SR 121. In the central part of town, it meets the eastern terminus of SR 152 (New Cobbtown Road). The concurrency heads south-southeast and curves to the south-southwest into Collins, There they meet SR 292 (Manassas Street). The concurrency heads south and curves to the southeast to enter Reidsville. In town they meet US 280/SR 30 (Brazell Street). The three routes continues to the southeast, until SR 121 splits off to the south, at a point northwest of Hughland. In Lynn is SR 169. In Glennville, SR 144 (Hencart Road) joins the concurrency for a short while. Farther to the east, in the main part of town, is US 25/US 301/SR 73 (Veterans Boulevard). At this intersection, SR 73 meets its southern terminus, SR 144 continues to the east, and US 25/US 301/SR 23/SR 57 head to the south-southwest. Just outside the city limits is the western terminus of SR 196 (Baxter–Durrence Road). The concurrent routes cross over Beards Creek, into Long County. They pass through rural areas of the county and enter Ludowici. There, they intersect US 84/SR 38 (Cypress Street). At this intersection, US 25/US 301/SR 23 turn right to follow US 84/SR 38 west out of town, while SR 57 continues its southeasterly routing. It passes through rural areas of the county, before entering McIntosh County. In Townsend, it intersects the northern terminus of SR 251 (Briardam Road). The route continues to the east for a few mile and curves to the southeast, until it meets its eastern terminus, an interchange with I-95 west of Eulonia. Here, the roadway continues as SR 99.

National Highway System 
The following portions of SR 57 are part of the National Highway System, a system of routes determined to be the most important for the nation's economy, mobility, and defense:
From its western terminus in East Macon to the eastern end of the SR 540 concurrency, southwest of Gordon
The entire length of the US 1/SR 4 concurrency, from just northwest of Swainsboro to a point south-southeast of the city.

Major intersections

Swainsboro connector route 

State Route 57 Connector (SR 57 Conn.) was a  connector route that functioned more like a bypass route. Its route was nearly completely within the city limits of Swainsboro.

It traveled to the south and west of the main part of Swainsboro, connecting what is now US 1 Bus./SR 4 Bus./SR 57 (South Main Street) with what is now US 80/SR 26/SR 56 (West Main Street) and the SR 57 mainline (Kight Road).

See also

References

External links

 Georgia Roads (Routes 41 – 60)

057
Transportation in Bibb County, Georgia
Transportation in Jones County, Georgia
Transportation in Twiggs County, Georgia
Transportation in Wilkinson County, Georgia
Transportation in Washington County, Georgia
Transportation in Johnson County, Georgia
Transportation in Emanuel County, Georgia
Transportation in Candler County, Georgia
Transportation in Tattnall County, Georgia
Transportation in Long County, Georgia
Transportation in McIntosh County, Georgia
Macon metropolitan area, Georgia